Windsor station in Windsor, Nova Scotia, Canada, is owned by the Windsor and Hantsport Railway. The railway no longer operates freight or passenger trains, but maintains one employee in the building. The prefabricated metal structure replaced an earlier station building when the railway line's route through Windsor was changed in the 1970s.

History
Windsor's first station was a large covered platform station built by the Nova Scotia Railway in 1858. It was replaced by a wooden gambrel roof station constructed by the Intercolonial Railway in 1881. A brick station was constructed in 1905 and the wooden station was relegated to freight duties. The brcij staiton was demolished in 1970 and replaced by the current structure.

References

External links
Windsor and Hantsport Railway

Railway stations in Nova Scotia